Ornstein may refer to:

 Axel Ornstein (b. 1952), Swedish chess master
 Donald Samuel Ornstein (b. 1934), American mathematician
 Jonathan G. Ornstein, CEO of Mesa Air Group, Inc.
 Leo Ornstein (1895–2002), Russian-American composer
 Leonard Salomon Ornstein (1880–1941), Dutch physicist known for the Ornstein–Zernike equation and the Ornstein–Uhlenbeck process
 Michael Marisi Ornstein (b. 1963), American actor
 Norman J. Ornstein, American political scientist
 Robert Ornstein (b. 1942), American psychologist 
 Severo Ornstein, American computer scientist and son of Leo Ornstein

In video games 
Dragon Slayer Ornstein, an enemy boss in the game Dark Souls.

See also
 Arnstein (disambiguation)
 Orenstein
 Gorenstein
 Hornstein (disambiguation)

Jewish surnames